The third season of the Chinese reality talent show Sing! China premiered on 13 July 2018, on Zhejiang Television. Jay Chou is the only coach to return from the previous season. Returning coach Harlem Yu and new coaches Li Jian and Nicholas Tse replaced Eason Chan, Liu Huan and Na Ying in this season.

This is the first season which resumed the usage of the Chinese show name "中国好声音", following the withdrawal of a legal dispute between Star China Media and its former partner Talpa Media in 2016 which barred the former from using the name that was previously seen on The Voice of China, a show which the latter owns the franchise. Despite reverting to its original Chinese name, the show would not be produced as part of The Voice franchise. It would retain its English name and continue to run in its original Sing! China competition format.

On 7 October, Tenzin Nyima 旦增尼玛 of Team Li Jian was announced as the winner of the season, with Li Zhenwu 黎真吾 of Team Harlem as runner-up. Liu Junge 刘郡格 of Team Nicholas finished in third place, while Team Jay's Su Han 宿涵 and Cering 周兴才让 finished in fourth and fifth place respectively.

Coaches and hosts

On 11 October 2017, three days after previous season's grand finals, Na Ying announced via her management that she has decided to leave the show and would not be returning for her third season as a coach. Her move also ended her six-year consecutive stint as a coach, which began since the first season of The Voice of China. Individuals rumoured to be replacing Na included Faye Wong, Tsai Chin and Su Rui. In an official statement, Chou's management said the rumour is "fake" as the team had yet to decide on Chou's involvement in the third season as the latter was "busy touring" and it was still premature to discuss a show that would only take place a year later. Lu Wei, the show's publicity director, said Chou would be invited to return as a coach, and refuted the claim that he has signed a three-year contract with the show as the show's production team renews contracts with the coaches every year. On 3 November, Chou was confirmed to be returning for his third season. On 28 March 2018, it was announced that Li Jian and Nicholas Tse would also be joining the show as new coaches, with a fourth coach that was yet to be announced. On 4 May, it was reported by the Taiwanese media that former coach Harlem Yu, who left the show after the first season, would be returning to the show as the unannounced fourth coach. Yu's involvement in the show was neither confirmed by his management nor the show's production team till 29 May, when it was officially announced via the show's social media that Yu would be the fourth and final coach to join the show. Eason Chan and last season's winning coach Liu Huan were therefore confirmed to have left the show.

This is the first season in the show's history not to feature a female coach, and also the first to have more than two coaches not originating from mainland China.

Hu Qiaohua returned for his second season as the main host. The eleventh episode was hosted by Rosy Luo.

Teams
 Colour key

Blind auditions 
The taping of the blind auditions began on 20 June and ended on 6 July. This season saw the return of the rotating coaches' chairs that are similar to the ones featured in The Voice which the show is rebranded from. The coaches would listen to the contestants on stage in those chairs which are faced away from the stage. If they like what they hear from a contestant, they press the button on their chairs which rotates them to face the stage. This signifies that the contestant has been recruited to join the respective coach's team. If more than one coach presses their button, the contestant would then choose the coach they want to work with. If none of the coaches presses their button, the losing artist would leave the stage straight away, without any conversations with the coaches, and the chairs would remain unturned.

In the blind auditions, the coaches are to recruit a total of six artists to form a team of their own. The forming of the teams this season would move to a format that is similar to the "Six-Chair Challenge" featured in the British version of The X Factor. Once a team is full with six artists occupying all the spots, the subsequent artists which the coach has successfully recruited would have to face-off with one of the six artists in the sing-offs for a spot in the team. The incoming artist may select any of the six defending artists to compete against in the sing-off, and both artists would each sing a new song and the coach would decide on the winner. The winner would be given the spot in the team while the other would be eliminated. For defending artists, once they have won a sing-off against an incoming artist, they would receive immunity from the subsequent sing-offs and immediately advance to the next round of the competition.

In this season, the performance order during the blind auditions would be decided on the spot by the coaches. The coaches would be given a list of songs which the artists would be performing, and the coaches would take turn to pick the songs which they would like to hear first, and the respective artist would be called upon the stage to perform the song. Therefore, the artists would only be notified of their performance order minutes before their performances. Before the artists perform, they would each select a coach which they would like to work with the most, and the coach's head shot would be shown in real-time on the large screen attached to their respective chairs during their performance. This allows the artists to see how their preferred coaches are reacting to their performances while the latter is facing away from the stage, thus potentially influencing the artist's final choice of coach.

The second episode, which was originally slated to air on 20 July, failed to air as planned due to "post-production complications and scheduling conflicts".

 Colour key

Episode 1 (13 July)
The four coaches performed a medley of each other's songs – Nicholas Tse and Harlem Yu performed their personal hits "让我一次爱个够" and "因为爱所以爱", Jay Chou performed Li Jian's "抚仙湖", Li performed Chou's "等你下课" – and concluded the performances with "霍元甲" and "万里长城永不倒".

 Annabella Chua 蔡咏琪 was originally featured in the first episode and was prominently known as the first artist to join Team Jay. However, she is believed to have been removed from the show as her age (17 years) has violated the new rules set out by the State Administration of Radio and Television which ban individuals below 18 years old from participating local television talent shows. Her audition was completely edited out in the rerun of the first episode, and clips of her involvement in the competition were also subsequently removed from video-sharing websites. She was neither mentioned nor shown in the later episodes as an artist of Team Jay, thus effectively confirmed her withdrawal from the competition.
 Huang Anqi 黄安琪 chose Li Jian as her preferred coach, while Liu Anqi 刘安琪 chose Jay Chou.

Episode 2 (27 July)

Episode 3 (3 August)

Episode 4 (10 August)

Episode 5 (17 August)

Sing-off details

The Battles
The Battle rounds began airing on 24 August and ended on the following week on 31 August. The first episode featured Battles from Team Nicholas and Team Li Jian, while the second would feature performances from Team Harlem and Team Jay.

For the first time in show's history, the show included the Battle rounds in the course of the competition which pairs two artists together for a duet. The winners of the Battles, as decided by the coaches, would advance to the Cross Battles. At the end of the Battles, the coaches would each select two losing artists from their team to perform in the coach's save round. The winners of the coach's save rounds would then advance to the Cross Battles as part of their team's final four.

 Colour key

 Li Jian was unable to choose a winner between Li Zhiyu 李志宇 and Wang Xuan 王轩 as he believed that the previous two losing artists from his team had performed better than the pair. As such, he sought approval from the producers and other coaches to allow all four artists to perform in the coach's save round where he would choose two to advance to the Cross Battles.

The Cross Battles
This season saw the return of the Cross Battles, which was last featured in the first season of the show. In the Cross Battles, coaches would have to compete with an opposing coach with their remaining artists for a spot in the Top 14, and a new rule was set this season to have the new coaches going head-to-head against the veteran coaches. Through the random drawing of lots, new coach Li Jian picked veteran coach Harlem Yu as his opposing coach, and therefore Jay Chou was defaulted to compete against Nicholas Tse in the Cross Battles.

Before the start of the Cross Battles, the coaches would decide on the appearance order of their artists, and this was done without the knowledge of their opposing coach. Therefore, all artists would not know who they are competing against until they were revealed on stage by the host. The coaches were also allowed to modify the appearance order of their artists at any point in the competition to counter the opposing artists in the remaining Cross Battles.

A total of four Cross Battles were held between two opposing coaches. At the end of each Cross Battle, the artist who received the most votes from the 51-person judging panel would win one point for their team, while the losing artist would not receive any. Each of the coaches was also given a trump card which they could exercise on one of their artists to allow the latter to win two points for the team if he wins the Cross Battles (if the artist loses the Cross Battle, the trump card would be forfeited). The allocation of the trump card to the artist has to be done by the coach before the artist was revealed on stage.

At the end of the Cross Battles, the team with the highest number of winning points will advance to the Cross Knockouts, and one artist from the losing team would be eliminated by coach as a penalty for losing the Cross Battles.

 Colour key

The Cross Knockouts
The Cross Knockout rounds began airing on 21 September and would end on the following week on 28 September. The Cross Knockouts would see the remaining 14 artists from various teams competing for a spot in the Top 7. The coaches would each take turn to send one of their artists out for the Cross Knockouts, with the selected artist named as the "Challenger". The "Challenger" would then pick an opposing team to compete against in the Cross Knockout. The specific artist from the opposing team which the "Challenger" would compete against, named as the "Challengee", would be decided via the random drawing of lots by the former. The "Challenger" would perform first, followed by the "Challengee".

At the end of each Cross Knockout, the two artists will receive votes of approval from a 51-person judging panel. The other two non-competitive coaches were also given one vote each which they have to cast for either one of the artists in the Cross Knockout pairing. The artist with the most votes will advance to the Playoffs, while the other would be eliminated.

 Colour key

 Huang Anqi 黄安琪 of Double Angel 打包安琪 voluntarily withdrew from this stage of the competition onwards due to the "physical and mental discomfort" arose from her participation in the competition. The other member of the group, Liu Anqi 刘安琪, moved on as a solo artist, but would still be credited as "Double Angel 打包安琪" on the show.

The Playoffs
The Top 7 performed in the Playoffs for a spot in the finals. The order of appearance of the artists was decided through the drawing of lots by their respective coaches. In deciding who moves on, a professional judging panel made up of 50 veteran record producers, music critics, and media practitioners from various media companies; as well as the studio audience made up of 500 members of the public were given an equal say. Each of the voters was entitled to one vote per artist, and they can either choose to vote or not vote for a particular artist. The total number of votes cast by the professional judging panel and studio audience were converted into points accordingly to the weightage (50% each). The five artists with the highest accumulated total points would advance to the finals.

 Colour key

Finals
The Top 5 performed live in a two-part season finale on 7 October, held at the Beijing National Stadium. In the first round of the competition, the five finalists performed a duet with their coach, and a solo song. Based on the public votes received from the live audience at the end of the first round, the bottom three artists with the fewest votes would be eliminated.

The final two artists would then sing their winner's song before a 100-person panel and live audience, who will vote for the winner at the end of the performances. Every member of the panel would be entitled to one vote, and the total number of votes received by the artists from the panel and live audience would be converted into percentage points accordingly. The artist who received the highest number of points would be announced as the winner.

 The performance featured fellow team members Golden Eggplosives 金色炸蛋.
 The performance featured fellow team member Zhang Shen'er 张神儿.
 Before the start of the solo performances in the first round, it was revealed that Su Han 宿涵 and Tenzin Nyima 旦增尼玛 were leading in the number of public votes.

Non-competition shows

The Mid-Autumn Special (24 September)
The eleventh episode was a two-hour special aired on 24 September, featuring performances by the coaches and artists in celebration of the Mid-Autumn Festival. The episode was hosted by Rosy Luo.

Reception

CSM52 ratings

References

2018 in Chinese music
2018 Chinese television seasons